The Nearness of You is the fifth studio album by Helen Merrill. It includes performances of standards from two sessions with completely different lineups of accompanying musicians. The later session from February 21, 1958, features very notable jazz performers such as pianist Bill Evans and bassist Oscar Pettiford.

Track listing
 "Bye Bye Blackbird" (Mort Dixon, Al Henderson) – 2:57
 "When the Sun Comes Out" (Harold Arlen, Ted Koehler) – 4:47
 "I Remember You" (Johnny Mercer, Victor Schertzinger) – 2:11
 "Softly, as in a Morning Sunrise" (Oscar Hammerstein II, Sigmund Romberg) – 3:19
 "Dearly Beloved" (Jerome Kern, Mercer) – 2:07
 "Summertime" (George Gershwin, Ira Gershwin, DuBose Heyward) – 3:28
 "All of You" (Cole Porter) – 3:33
 "I See Your Face Before Me" (Howard Dietz, Arthur Schwartz) – 2:39
 "Let Me Love You" (Harlan Howard) – 2:48
 "The Nearness of You" (Hoagy Carmichael, Ned Washington) – 4:06
 "This Time the Dream's on Me" (Arlen, Mercer) – 2:21
 "Just Imagine" (Lew Brown, Buddy DeSylva, Henderson) – 3:21

Reception

John Bush of AllMusic said that "[a]lternately breathy and atmospheric or bright and dynamic, Helen Merrill often reaches a bit too far on The Nearness of You, though her distinct style and strong personality may be refreshing to vocal fans tired of the standard versions of standards. ... Her powerful voice occasionally gets her into trouble, breaking from breathy to brash and often occupying a rather awkward middle ground." The Bill Evans biographer Peter Pettinger wrote of the session featuring the pianist, "Merrill, enticingly warm, molded the intensity of her tone like a horn, coloring her line with a tastefully controlled vibrato." He also quotes Merrill herself as saying, "Bill was a wonderful accompanist. But is that any wonder since he was so very sensitive and endlessly musical?"

Personnel
Tracks 01, 03, 04, 05, 06, 08, 11:
Helen Merrill – vocals
Mike Simpson – flute
Dick Marx – piano
Fred Rundquist – guitar
Johnny Frigo – double bass
Jerry Slosberg – drums
David Carroll – arranger, conductor

Tracks 02, 07, 09, 10, 12:
Helen Merrill – vocals
Bobby Jaspar – flute
Bill Evans – piano
Barry Galbraith – guitar
Oscar Pettiford – double bass
Jo Jones – drums
George Russell – arranger, conductor

References

EmArcy Records albums
Helen Merrill albums
1958 albums
Albums conducted by Hal Mooney
Albums conducted by David Carroll (musician)
Albums arranged by David Carroll (musician)
Albums arranged by Hal Mooney